Maxiangtun railway station  is a station on the Chinese Qingzang Railway. It is a fourth-class station. Passenger transportation is not handled, and no passenger trains are temporarily parked.

See also

 Qingzang Railway
 List of stations on Qingzang railway

References

Railway stations in Tibet
Stations on the Qinghai–Tibet Railway